Scarthyla is a genus of tree frogs, the family Hylidae. They are found in the upper Amazon Basin of Bolivia, Peru, and Brazil and northward through Colombia and Venezuela to the Caribbean lowlands. They are sometimes known as Madre de Dios treefrogs and South American aquatic treefrogs. They are semiaquatic.

Species
The genus contains two species:
 Scarthyla goinorum — Tarauaca snouted treefrog, Madre de Dios treefrog
 Scarthyla vigilans — Maracaibo Basin treefrog

References

Hylidae
 
Amphibians of South America
Amphibian genera
Taxa named by William Edward Duellman
Taxonomy articles created by Polbot